Estradiol 3-glucuronide 17β-sulfate (E2-3G-17S) is an endogenous estrogen conjugate and metabolite of estradiol. It is related to estradiol 3-sulfate and estradiol 17β-glucuronide. Estradiol 3-glucuronide 17β-sulfate has 0.0001% of the relative binding affinity of estradiol for the ERα, one of the two estrogen receptors (ERs). It shows less than one million-fold lower potency in activating the estrogen receptors relative to estradiol in vitro.

See also
 Catechol estrogen
 Estrogen conjugate
 Lipoidal estradiol
 List of estrogen esters § Estradiol esters

References

Estradiol esters
Human metabolites
Phenol esters
Sulfate esters